Ludovico Clodio (died 1514) was a Roman Catholic prelate who served as Bishop of Nocera Umbra (1508–1514).

Biography
On 28 July 1508, Ludovico Clodio was appointed by Pope Julius II as Bishop of Nocera Umbra.
He served as Bishop of Nocera Umbra until his death in July 1514.

References

External links and additional sources
 (for Chronology of Bishops) 
 (for Chronology of Bishops) 

16th-century Italian Roman Catholic bishops
Bishops appointed by Pope Julius II
1514 deaths